The CWF Mid-Atlantic Tag Team Championship was a professional wrestling tag team championship in Carolina Wrestling Federation Mid-Atlantic (CWF Mid-Atlantic). It was the original tag team title of the Carolina Wrestling Federation promotion, later used in the Frontier Wrestling Alliance (2001-2004) and AWA Superstars (2005-2007) as a regional title, officially representing the Mid-Atlantic United States, while it was a member of the respective governing bodies. It was introduced as the CWF Tag Team Championship in early 2000.

The inaugural champions were The Dupps (Bo and Stan Dupp), after being awarded the title in 2000 to become the first CWF Tag Team Champions. The SouthSide Playas (J-Money and LA Cash) hold the record for most reigns, with three. At 385 days, Rob "Boogie Woogie Man" McBride and Tank Lawson's first and only reign is the longest in the title's history. While champions, they also defended the AWA World Tag Team Championship. Semper Ferocious' (Bobby Wohlfert and Devin Dalton) only reign was the shortest in the history of the title lasting only 35 days. Overall, there have been 51 reigns shared between 42 teams, with three vacancies.

Title history

References
General

Specific

External links

CWF Mid-Atlantic Tag Team Title at Genickbruch.com
CWF Mid-Atlantic Tag Team Title at Cagematch.de

CWF Mid-Atlantic championships
Tag team wrestling championships
United States regional professional wrestling championships